The 2007 Waterford Crystal Cup was the second staging of the Waterford Crystal Cup. The cup began on 14 January 2007 and ended on 4 February 2007.

Limerick were the defending champions but were defeated by the Limerick Institute of Technology in the preliminary round.

On 4 February 2007, Tipperary won the cup following a 1-17 to 2-11 defeat of Cork in the final. This was their first Waterford Crystal Cup title.

Results

Preliminary round

Quarter-finals

Semi-finals

Final

Top scorers

Overall

Single game

References

Waterford Crystal Cup
Waterford Crystal Cup